Dossa Momad Omar Hassamo Júnior (born 28 July 1986), known as Dossa Júnior, is a former professional footballer who played as a central defender.

He spent the better part of his 15-year senior career in the Cypriot First Division, mainly with AEL Limassol. He also competed in Portugal (where he was born), Poland and Turkey.

Júnior won 24 caps for Cyprus, making his debut in 2012.

Club career
Júnior was born in Lisbon, of Mozambican descent. He only played with Imortal D.C. in Portugal, spending the 2005–06 season in the third tier. Subsequently, the 20-year-old moved to Cyprus, joining Digenis Akritas Morphou FC in the First Division and suffering relegation.

Júnior remained in that nation afterwards, with AEP Paphos FC. In 2009 he signed a contract with AEL Limassol, scoring three goals in 28 games in the 2011–12 campaign to help the latter win the national championship after a 44-year wait.

On 10 June 2015, after two years in Poland with Legia Warsaw, being first-choice as they won the Ekstraklasa in 2013–14, Júnior signed for Konyaspor. In the following transfer window, he was loaned to fellow Turkish Süper Lig team Eskişehirspor.

Júnior saw out his career at former side AEL. On 22 May 2019, his first-half header opened an eventual 2–0 victory against APOEL FC in the final of the Cypriot Cup, a first for the club in 30 years.

International career
In 2012, following an extended career in the country, Júnior gained Cypriot nationality, being subsequently called up to play for the national team. He made his debut on 15 August that year, in the 1–0 friendly loss in Bulgaria.

Personal life
Júnior's sister married fellow footballer Hélio Pinto.

Career statistics

Club

International goals
Scores and results list Cyprus' goal tally first, score column indicates score after each Júnior goal.

Honours
AEL Limassol
Cypriot First Division: 2011–12
Cypriot Cup: 2018–19

Legia Warsaw
Ekstraklasa: 2013–14
Polish Cup: 2014–15

References

External links

1986 births
Living people
Portuguese people of Mozambican descent
Cypriot people of Mozambican descent
Portuguese footballers
Cypriot footballers
Footballers from Lisbon
Association football defenders
Segunda Divisão players
Imortal D.C. players
Cypriot First Division players
Cypriot Second Division players
Digenis Akritas Morphou FC players
AEP Paphos FC players
AEL Limassol players
Ekstraklasa players
Legia Warsaw players
Süper Lig players
Konyaspor footballers
Eskişehirspor footballers
Cyprus international footballers
Portuguese expatriate footballers
Cypriot expatriate footballers
Expatriate footballers in Cyprus
Expatriate footballers in Poland
Expatriate footballers in Turkey
Portuguese expatriate sportspeople in Cyprus
Portuguese expatriate sportspeople in Poland
Portuguese expatriate sportspeople in Turkey